The Honduras national under-23 football team represents Honduras in international football competitions (finals stage and qualifiers) in Olympic Games and Pan American Games. The selection is limited to players under the age of 23, except for three over-age players. The team is controlled by the Federación Nacional Autónoma de Fútbol de Honduras (FENAFUTH). Honduras have qualified for five Men's Olympic Football Tournaments, in Sydney 2000, Beijing 2008, London 2012, Rio de Janeiro 2016 and Tokyo 2020.

Results and fixtures

2021

Head-to-head record

Includes data from CONCACAF Men's Olympic Qualifying Tournament and Summer Olympics only

Coaching staff

Current coaching staff

Manager history
List of managers since 1975 to present:
 1975:  Peter Lange
 1983:  Roberto González
 1986–1987:  Ángel Rodríguez
 1991:  Luis López
 1991–1992:  Flavio Ortega
 1999–2000:  Ramón Maradiaga
 2003–2004:  Edwin Pavón
 2007–2008:  Alexis Mendoza
 2008:  Gilberto Yearwood
 2011:  Miguel Falero
 2012–2014:  Luis Suárez
 2015–2017:  Jorge Pinto
 2019:  Fabián Coito
 2021:  Miguel Falero

Players

Current squad
The following 22 players were called up for the 2020 Summer Olympics, and two preceding friendly matches against Japan and Germany.

* Overage player.

Overage players in Olympic Games

Honours
Major competitions
Pan American Games
Silver medalists (2): 1999, 2019
CONCACAF Olympic Qualifying Tournament
Winners (2): 2000, 2008
Runners-up (3): 2012, 2015, 2020
Third place (1): 2004

Records

Top goalscorers

(If the section features an image, remove the columned formatting)

Competitive record

Olympic Games

CONCACAF Men's Olympic Qualifying Tournament

Pan American Games

See also
Sport in Honduras
Football in Honduras
Honduras national football team

References

External links
 Honduras national under-23 football team – official website
 Men's Olympic Football Tournament: Honduras at FIFA.com

Central American national under-23 association football teams
Under-23
Honduras at the Olympic Football Tournament